Hickory Grove may refer to several places in the United States:

 Hickory Grove, Alabama
 Hickory Grove, Arkansas
 Hickory Grove, Adams County, Illinois
 Hickory Grove, Carroll County, Illinois
 Hickory Grove Township, Indiana
 Hickory Grove, Iowa
 Hickory Grove, Kentucky
 Hickory Grove, Mississippi
 Hickory Grove, New York
 Hickory Grove, North Carolina
 Hickory Grove, Ohio
 Hickory Grove, Pennsylvania
 Hickory Grove, South Carolina
 Hickory Grove, Tennessee
 Hickory Grove, Virginia
 Hickory Grove, West Virginia
 Hickory Grove, Hampshire County, West Virginia
 Hickory Grove (Romney, West Virginia), a historic house
 Hickory Grove, Wisconsin, a town
 Hickory Grove, Grant County, Wisconsin, an unincorporated community
 Hickory Grove, Manitowoc County, Wisconsin, an unincorporated community